Onarheimsvatnet or Opsangervatnet is a lake in the municipality of Kvinnherad in Vestland county, Norway.  The  lake is located between the villages of Husnes and Sunde.

See also
List of lakes in Norway

References

Kvinnherad
Lakes of Vestland